Progress M-65, identified by NASA as Progress 30P, was a Progress spacecraft used to resupply the International Space Station. It was a Progress-M 11F615A55 spacecraft, with the serial number 365.

Launch
Progress M-65 was launched by a Soyuz-U carrier rocket from Site 1/5 at the Baikonur Cosmodrome. Launch occurred at 19:50 UTC on 10 September 2008.

Docking
The spacecraft docked with the aft port of the Zvezda module at 18:43 UTC on 17 September 2008. Docking had originally been scheduled for 21:01 GMT on 12 September 2008, but was delayed after Hurricane Ike forced NASA to close the Johnson Space Center, which houses the US mission control centre for the ISS. A backup facility at the Marshall Space Flight Center was used during the docking. Following undocking at 16:19 UTC on 15 November 2008, it conducted a Plazma-Progress experiment. It was deorbited on 8 December 2008, with the 142 second deorbit burn beginning at 08:02 UTC. The spacecraft burned up in the atmosphere over the Pacific Ocean, with any remaining debris landing in the ocean at around 08:49 UTC.

Cargo
Progress M-65 carried supplies to the International Space Station, including food, water and oxygen for the crew and equipment for conducting scientific research. It also carried a new Orlan-MK spacesuit to replace one of the older Orlan-M suits previously used for EVAs from the station.

See also

 List of Progress flights
 Uncrewed spaceflights to the International Space Station

References

Spacecraft launched in 2008
Progress (spacecraft) missions
Spacecraft which reentered in 2008
Supply vehicles for the International Space Station
Spacecraft launched by Soyuz-U rockets